Pinnacle Motorsport (formerly PRT Racing) is an Irish licensed, Philippines based motor racing team founded in 2016 by Irish former racers John O'Hara and Gary Thompson. Both have experience at Formula 3 level, the former a race winner in the Asian Formula Three series, and had tested for the A1 Team Ireland, the latter featuring in the Japanese F3 and 2013 F3 European series. While the team began using the PRT Racing name in the 2016 Formula Masters China series and 2016-17 Asian Le Mans Series sprint and endurance LMP3 events, they adopted the Pinnacle Motorsport name from the 2017 season onward. Further involvement in open wheel racing came in China F4 and F3 Asian series.
However, both prior to their official formation and throughout their continued operations, Pinnacle have partnered with KCMG to operate many of their motorsport programs across Asia including the Blancpain GT Series Asia GT3Am, Audi R8 LMS Cup, FRD LMP3 Series, Asian Le Mans Series, Asian Formula Renault Series, and the aforementioned Formula Masters China series. A similar partnership also existed in F3 Asia with B-Max Racing.

History

Formula Masters China
For the inaugural season using their own name, the team ran as Cebu Pacific Air by PRT, with three cars initially announced for the first round of the 2016 season driven by Kim Jeong-tae, Nick Rowe and "Jeffrey" Ye Junhui. They would take all 3 victories at the opening round at Shanghai, as well as further podium appearances at Zuhai, Buriram and Sepang. Rowe would only partake in the opening round due to illness and scheduling conflicts, being partially replaced by Thomas Swift, and Ye would leave after the two Chinese rounds, leaving Kim Jeong Tae as the team's only full time driver. He would achieve three more podiums at the final round at Penbay, ending the season 4th in the drivers championship and 2nd in the team's championship, before tragically losing his life in road accident in South Korea.

The 2017 season would see the rebrand to Pinnacle Motorsport, retaining the Cebu Pacific Air sponsorship, and again beginning the season with three cars piloted by Taylor Cockerton, Antolin Gonzales, and Ben Grimes. Cockerton started the season strongly at the first Sepang round with a win and two podiums, and was a consistent podium finisher throughout the second Sepang and both Zuhai rounds, whereas Grimes and Gonzales were often point scorers, the former also grabbing a double podium at Zhuhai. 
Gonzales would not return for the second Zhuhai round, and a three car entry was restored for the Shanghai finale with the addition of "Billy" Zheng Jiannian. Here, Cockerton clinched the driver's title, winning three out of the four races that weekend as well as four fastest laps and two poles, to overturn his closest rival Daniel Lu by a margin of three points.

Asian Le Mans
PRT Racing entered into both the 2016 Asian Le Mans Sprint Cup, and the 2016-17 Endurance Series, with team owner Ate de Jong and Ginetta factory driver Charlie Robertson driving the #67 Ginetta in the LMP3 category. In the three rounds and six races held at Sepang in the Sprint Cup, the team achieved a win and two other podiums, finishing 2nd in the LMP3 standings.
The same car and driver lineup was retained for the Endurance Series, with the addition of Martin Rump for the first two rounds. The team would not have much success, with a retirement at Zuhai, points finishes at Fuji and Buriram, before another retirement in the final round at Sepang ended their campaign.

China Formula 4 Championship
Having contested the first round of the 2018 US F4 Championship with two retirements and a DNS, Jordan Dempsey made the switch to China F4 with Pinnacle Motorsport. Despite another retirement in Race 1, he achieved two second place finishes at Zuhai, before going on a run of seven wins in nine races at Chengdu, Ningbo and Shanghai. Points and a podium at Wuhan, before another win and two podiums at the final round back at Ningbo sealed the driver's title by 50 points even after missing the first round.

F3 Asian Championship
Following the replacement of the Formula Masters China series with the F3 Asian Championship, Pinnacle were one of several teams to sign up for the inaugural season in 2018. The team announced Daniel Cao for the first round at Sepang, as well as collaborating with B-Max Racing to provide a car for "Dragon". This collaboration would continue at Shanghai and again at the final round returning to Sepang, where he was joined by Tairoku Yamaguchi, as well as Liam Lawson driving the Pinnacle team branded car. Lawson would take the final round’s three wins, and the team would finish 5th in the standings.

In 2019, F3 Asia ran two championships, the winter series and the main championship in the summer. Pinnacle’s line up for the former was David Schumacher, Amaury Cordeel and Akash Nandy. Schumacher and Cordeel would leave after the second round, being replaced by Victor Martins and Christian Lundgaard. Season highlights included a Schumacher podium at Buriram, and two podiums for guest driver Martins at Sepang ending up 3rd in the team standings. The relationship with B-Max and "Dragon" continued, alongside Tairoku Yamaguchi, as well as Motoyoshi Yoshida and Miki Koyama.

The summer series line-up consisted of the team’s Chinese F4 champion Jordan Dempsey and Tommy Smith, with Ayrton Simmons replacing Dempsey for round 2 and driving alongside him in round 4. Highlights for Dempsey would be two podiums at Suzuka and Shanghai to finish 7th in the standings, along with the points finishes of Simmons and Smith to help the team to 4th in the teams’ championship.

With F3 Asia fully committing to a winter series format for 2019-20, the team contested the season with 2019 Summer series runner up Jack Doohan and Pietro Fittipaldi as full time drivers. Sebastián Fernández would appear in the third car at both UAE rounds, and Dominic Ang entered for the fourth round at Sepang. Doohan would pick up a win at Sepang and Dubai, as well as all three wins at the second visit to Sepang, ultimately finishing as championship runner up. Fernandez also had success in his brief time with the team, taking two podiums in Dubai and a race win in Abu Dhabi, Fittipaldi was a consistent point scorer, clinching 5th, and Ang retired and failed to start in his entered races.
For the 2021 season, all rounds were held in the UAE because of travel restrictions put in place due to the COVID-19 pandemic. The lineup for the condensed season would be rookies Pierre-Louis Chovet, Alexandre Bardinon and Matthias Lüthen, and returning to the championship to join Pinnacle would be Alessio Deledda. Chovet would be the surprise package of the series, picking up 6 wins and finishing 2nd in the standings. Deledda would record two points finishes, both at Dubai, whereas Bardinon and Lüthen did not score.

F4 Spanish Championship
For the 2021 season, Pinnacle announced they were joining the F4 Spanish Championship grid with Alex Dunne. Together, they achieved a pole and podium in their opening weekend at Spa, though prior to round 4 Dunne announced he had parted ways with both Pinnacle and KCMG due to circumstances beyond his control.

Current series results

F3 Asian Championship/Formula Regional Asian Championship

Formula Regional Middle East Championship

F3 Asian Winter Series

† As Martins and Lundgaard were guest drivers, they were ineligible for points.

F4 Spanish Championship

Formula 4 UAE Championship

Former series results

Formula Masters China

Asian Le Mans

Sprint Cup

Endurance Series

F4 Chinese Championship

Timeline

References

External links 
  
 

Irish auto racing teams
Auto racing teams established in 2016
Sports teams in Metro Manila
Formula Regional teams